Vatndalsvatnet or Vatnedalsvatnet is a lake in the municipality of Bykle in Agder county, Norway. The nearby lakes Ormsavatnet and Store Urevatn flow into the lake through dams and canals. The lake Vatndalsvatnet also has a dam on it and the water flows out of the lake from the dam into the Otra river. The lake is located in the central part of Bykle, about halfway between the villages of Hovden and Bykle. The mountains Snjoheinuten and Kvervetjønnuten both lie on the south side of the lake.

See also
List of lakes in Aust-Agder
List of lakes in Norway

References

Bykle
Lakes of Agder
Reservoirs in Norway